Louis II (26 December 1777 – 16 June 1848) was Grand Duke of Hesse and by Rhine from 6 April 1830 until 5 March 1848, resigning during the German Revolution of 1848. He was the son of Louis I, Grand Duke of Hesse, and Princess Louise of Hesse-Darmstadt.

Life

Before his reign 
He studied at Leipzig University. Thereafter, he lived mostly in Darmstadt. 1804 he represented his father at the coronation of Napoleon in Paris. He took part in the Congress of Erfurt and the Congress of Vienna and attended the coronation of Louis XVIII in Paris.

Based on the 1820 Constitution of the Grand Duchy of Hesse, he was a member of the First Chamber of Parliament until becoming sovereign in 1830. He was not really active in parliament apart from defending the constitution against any attempts to amend it.

He was not really interested in governmental affairs, despite most cabinet ministers trying to include and brief him on current matters.

Reign 
He began his reign on April 6, 1830. He provoked a conflict with parliament as he demanded that his large personal debt be taken over by the state. Due to his reactionary positions, he was in conflict with parliament almost his entire reign.

Shortly after becoming sovereign, he had to deal with uprisings in Upper Hesse, which he left to his brother Prince Emil. Emil and Prime Minister Karl du Thil were the actual government of the Grand Duchy at the time.

Resignation and death 
The German revolutions of 1848–1849 showed his inability to govern. On March 5, 1848 he named his son Louis III as cos-regent.

Following his death shortly afterwards, he was at first burried in the Stadtkirche Darmstadt, before his body was moved to the Old Mausoleum in Park Rosenhöhe in 1910.

Marriage and issue
On 19 June 1804, in Karlsruhe, he married his first cousin Princess Wilhelmine of Baden, youngest daughter of Charles Louis, Hereditary Prince of Baden, and his wife, Amalie of Hesse-Darmstadt.

Due to Louis's affairs, the union proved an unhappy one, and the couple separated after the birth of their third child, who was his second surviving child.

Wilhelmine had four children in the 1820s, but it was widely rumored that their real father was her chamberlain August von Senarclens de Grancy. Louis II nonetheless acknowledged them, and they were considered legitimate Princes and Princesses of Hesse and by Rhine by the nobles of Europe. Two of them lived to adulthood.

Prince Ludwig of Hesse-Darmstadt (9 June 1806 – 13 June 1877); (the future Grand Duke).
 Stillborn son (18 August 1807).
 Prince Karl Wilhelm Ludwig of Hesse-Darmstadt (23 April 1809 – 20 March 1877).
 Princess Amalia Elisabeth Luise Karoline Friederike Wilhelmine of Hesse-Darmstadt (20 May 1821 – 27 May 1826).
 Stillborn daughter (7 June 1822).
 Prince Alexander Ludwig Georg Friedrich Emil of Hesse-Darmstadt (15 July 1823 – 15 December 1888)
 Princess Maximiliane Wilhelmine Auguste Sophie Marie of Hesse-Darmstadt (8 August 1824 – 3 June 1880); the future Empress consort of Alexander II of Russia.

Ancestry

References

External links

 

 
 
 

1777 births
1848 deaths
Nobility from Darmstadt
Members of the First Chamber of the Estates of the Grand Duchy of Hesse
Landgraves of Hesse-Darmstadt
Hereditary Grand Dukes of Hesse
Burials at the Mausoleum for the Grand Ducal House of Hesse, Rosenhöhe (Darmstadt)